Scymnus brullei, the Brullé's lady beetle, is a species of dusky lady beetle in the family Coccinellidae. It is found in North America. The specific name brullei honours Gaspard Auguste Brullé.

References

Further reading

 

Coccinellidae
Beetles of North America
Taxa named by Étienne Mulsant
Beetles described in 1850
Articles created by Qbugbot